Xiashu railway station is a railway station of Shanghai-Nanjing Intercity Railway located in Jiangsu, People's Republic of China. As of June 2016, there's no construction plans to start.

Currently it's a station of Beijing-Shanghai railway with no passenger services.

References

Railway stations in Jiangsu